Imbralyx is a genus of flowering plant in the family Fabaceae, native from Bangladesh and south-central China to Sumatra. The genus was established by Robert Geesink in 1984.

Species
, Plants of the World Online accepted the following species:

Imbralyx albiflorus (Prain) R.Geesink
Imbralyx bracteolatus (Dasuki & Schot) Z.Q.Song
Imbralyx incredibilis (Whitmore) Z.Q.Song
Imbralyx leptobotrys (Dunn) Z.Q.Song
Imbralyx leucanthus (Kurz) Z.Q.Song
Imbralyx ngii (Whitmore) Z.Q.Song
Imbralyx niveus (Dunn) Z.Q.Song
Imbralyx pierrei (Gagnep.) Z.Q.Song
Imbralyx unifoliatus (Prain) Z.Q.Song

References

Millettieae
Fabaceae genera